Charles O. Jones (born 1931) is non-resident Senior Fellow at the Miller Center of Public Affairs at the University of Virginia. He is a graduate of the University of South Dakota and the University of Wisconsin–Madison. He has been a fellow of the American Academy of Arts and Sciences and a Guggenheim fellow. He is a leading scholar of American politics. He is also a non-resident Senior Fellow in the Governmental Studies Program at The Brookings Institution. Jones has written or edited 18 books and contributed over 100 articles and book chapters.

Academic career 
Jones has held a number of distinguished academic appointments, including:
 Professor of Political Science, University of Virginia
 Hawkins Professor of Political Science, University of Wisconsin–Madison
 Maurice Falk Professor of American Government, University of Pittsburgh
 John Olin Professor of American Government, Oxford University
 Non-resident Senior Fellow, Brookings Institution
 President, American Political Science Association
 President, Pi Sigma Alpha

Scholarly focus 
Jones has written broadly on American politics, but his primary focus has been on the relationship between the Congress and the President.   He has written a number of influential books, including The Presidency in a Separated System and An Introduction to Public Policy.

See also
 Harold Lasswell

References

External links

University of Wisconsin–Madison alumni
American political scientists
University of Virginia faculty
University of Wisconsin–Madison faculty
1931 births
Place of birth missing (living people)
Living people